Zibello is a town in the Province of Parma in the Italian region Emilia-Romagna, located about  northwest of Bologna and about  northwest of Parma. It was an independent comune until 1 January 2016, when it merged with Polesine Parmense to form the new comune of Polesine Zibello.

The town is also known for the production of culatello di Zibello.

Cities and towns in Emilia-Romagna